WOCK-CD, virtual channel 13 (VHF digital channel 4), is a low-power, Class A Shop LC–affiliated television station licensed to Chicago, Illinois, United States. The station is owned by Skokie-based KM Communications. WOCK-CD's studios are located on North Kedzie Avenue in Chicago, and its transmitter is located atop the John Hancock Center.

History

The station was originally assigned the translator call sign of W13BE; it changed to WOCK-LP in 1994, and received Class A status in 2000, making it WOCK-CA.

WOCK was an affiliate of The Box until that network's acquisition by Viacom in 2001, resulting in The Box being merged into MTV2. The station became an affiliate of Florida-based Videomix which aired hip hop music videos, during the mid-summer 2001. That autumn, it began broadcasting programs from China Central Television, carrying a mix of CCTV-4 and CCTV-9 programming provided by China Star TV. It switched to Azteca América in October 2003, and then to CV Network in late 2008.

WOCK-CA received a construction permit to build a low-power digital television station, WOCK-CD, on channel 4, radiating primarily to the southwest. This took to the air at midnight on June 4, 2009, with WOCK then ceasing its analog transmission.

After the transition, WOCK was running the CV Network programming previously seen on the analog signal on virtual channel 13.1, and Korean language programming, simulcast from co-owned WOCH-CA, on virtual channel 13.2. WOCK dropped CV Network for Mega TV on January 11, 2010.

In July 2010, WOCK acquired LATV from WGN-TV, after the latter dropped the network; it shortly after began its run on WOCK-CD's subchannel, 13.3.

In August 2012, WOCK moved MegaTV to 13.5 and began carrying the MundoFox network on the primary 13.1 in HD. They also dropped LATV, which moved to W25DW-D as 25.5. Additionally, WOCK's main signal was picked up by Fox Television Stations on WPWR-TV over their 50.3 digital subchannel, both to provide a full-power over-the-air signal of MundoFox to the market and to address the weaknesses of transmitting in the low VHF band digitally.

On January 28, 2013, America One/Asian American Network on 13.4 was replaced by WeatherNation TV.

On May 27, 2013, MegaTV was replaced by Soul of the South Network.

In January 2014, WeatherNation TV was replaced by Infomercials, then replaced by TheCoolTV a few months later.

On March 1, 2015, Soul of the South was replaced by Arirang after WOCK's owners filed a lawsuit for breach of contract due to non-payment of lease fees.

On March 1, 2015, TheCoolTV was replaced by Karmaloop TV. It was then replaced by FAD Channel in May 2015.

Some time in August 2015, the WPWR-DT3 simulcast of 13.1 was taken dark after ownership of MundoFox was transferred fully to RCN Televisión; the network was rebranded as MundoMax, and Fox had no further obligations to extend WOCK's signal.

In August 2016, 13.1 stopped airing MundoMax and began airing infomercials.

Newscasts
WOCK-CD launched a 9 p.m. newscast, Hoy Noticias MundoFox 13 (later Hoy Noticias MundoMax) on April 18, 2014. The newscast was produced by the Chicago Tribune-owned Spanish-language newspaper Hoy.

Subchannels
The station's digital signal is multiplexed:

References

OCK-CD
Low-power television stations in the United States
OCK-CD
Television channels and stations established in 1984
1984 establishments in Illinois